Lionel Richard (born 1938) is a French poet, historian and a former professor for Cultural studies.

Career 
Richard is a former faculty member of the Université de Picardie Jules Verne in Amiens. His essays are regularly published by French publishing houses and periodicals such as Le Magazine littéraire, Le Monde diplomatique and 'Encyclopædia Universalis.

Since 1971, Richard mainly works on various aspects of German history of the 20th century, dedicating himself mainly to National Socialist Germany and its effects on humanity and culture. Amongst other subjects he described the Daily Life in the Weimar Republic, created the Encyclopedia of Bauhaus and featured German expressionism. A series of his essays were translated into different languages and are now points of references in their field.

He was one of the hosts of Le Panorama, a radio show on cultural affairs presented by France Culture in 1968 to 1998. In 2010, Richard for the first time named Maximilian Scheer as the before unknown author of the 1936 publication Das deutsche Volk klagt an. In this book (in English: The German People's Indictment), Scheer and his collaborators presented the cruelty of the Nazi regime in its first three years of existence and outlined precisely its intention to go to war and to murder the Jews and other groups of German society. Richard presented his findings in Le Monde diplomatique, and thereafter he wrote a foreword for the reprint of the book in 2012.

Publications

Poems 
La Voix des flammes, Éditions José Millas-Martin, 1957
Le Bois et la Cendre, Éditions Action poétique,1959
 « Orphiques », published in Marginales, February 1967, N° 112, 15-19

Essays and Non-fiction Books 
Nazisme et littérature, Éditions Maspero, 1971
D'une apocalypse à l'autre - Sur l'Allemagne et ses productions intellectuelles de la fin du XXe siècle aux années trente, 10-18, 1976. Réédition: Somogy, 1998
Le Nazisme et la Culture, Éditions Complexe, 1999
Encyclopédie du Bauhaus, Somogy, 1986
La Vie quotidienne sous la République de Weimar, Hachette, 1991
L'Expressionnisme, Collection Petite encyclopédie, Somogy, 1993
Cabaret, cabarets, Plon, 1991
D’où vient Adolf Hitler ?, Autrement, 2000
Expressionnistes allemands - Panorama bilingue d'une génération, Complexe, 2001
L’aventure de l’art contemporain de 1945 à nos jours, Le Chêne, 2002
De l'exotisme aux arts premiers, Éditions Le Chêne, 2004
Arts premiers : l’évolution d’un regard,Le Chêne/Hachette, 2005
L’art et la guerre : les artistes confrontés à la Seconde Guerre mondiale, Hachette, 2005 
Suite et séquelles de l’Allemagne nazie, Éditions Syllepse, 2005
Nazisme et barbarie, Complexe, 2006
Goebbels, Portrait d'un manipulateur, André Versaille éditeur, 2008
Avant l'apocalypse : Berlin 1919-1933 , Autrement, 2013

External links 
 

1938 births
20th-century French poets
21st-century French non-fiction writers
French male poets
Modernist poets
Writers from Dreux
Living people
20th-century French male writers